Melanoplus pygmaeus, known generally as pygmy short-wing grasshopper, is a species of spur-throated grasshopper in the family Acrididae. Other common names include the pygmy sandhill grasshopper and pygmy locust. It is found in North America.

References

Melanoplinae
Articles created by Qbugbot
Insects described in 1915